Christopher Hugh Gosden  (born 6 September 1955) is a British and Australian archaeologist specialising in the archaeology of identity, particularly English identity. He is Professor of European Archaeology and Director of the Institute of Archaeology at the University of Oxford. He is also a trustee of the British Museum.

Early life and education
Gosden was born on 6 September 1955. His biological mother was Jean Weddell (1928–2013), a physician, academic, and bell-ringer. She gave him up for adoption soon after birth, and he was subsequently adopted by Hugh and Margaret Gosden. The family emigrated to Australia, but later returned to the United Kingdom: he holds both Australian and British citizenship. He reconnected with his birth mother in 1987.

Gosden studied archaeology at the University of Sheffield, graduating with a Bachelor of Arts (BA) degree in 1977 and a Doctor of Philosophy (PhD) degree in 1983.

Academic career
From 1984 to 1985, Gosden was a visiting fellow and postdoctoral researcher at the Australian National University. He then moved to La Trobe University, where he had been appointed a lecturer in its Department of Archaeology in 1986. He had been promoted to senior lecturer by the time he left Australia in 1993.

In 1994, Gosden joined the University of Oxford as curator of the Pitt Rivers Museum and a university lecturer in archaeology. He was also a fellow of St Cross College, Oxford, from 1994 to 2006: he is now an Emeritus Fellow of the college. He was awarded a title of distinction as Professor of Archaeology in 2004, and served as head of the School of Archaeology between 2004 and 2006. He stepped down as Curator of the Pitt Rivers Museum in 2006, when he was appointed to the Chair of European Archaeology and elected a fellow of Keble College, Oxford.

In 2005, Gosden was elected a Fellow of the British Academy (FBA), the United Kingdom's national academy for the humanities and social sciences. In 2016, he was elected a Corresponding Fellow of the Australian Academy of the Humanities (FAHA).

Personal life
In 1992, Gosden married Jane Kaye. She is a legal scholar and Director of the Centre for Law, Health and Emerging Technologies at the University of Oxford. They have two children.

Selected works

References 

British archaeologists
Fellows of Keble College, Oxford
Fellows of the British Academy
1955 births
Alumni of the University of Sheffield
Trustees of the British Museum
Living people
Academic staff of the Australian National University
Academic staff of La Trobe University
Fellows of St Cross College, Oxford
Australian archaeologists
Fellows of the Australian Academy of the Humanities
People associated with the Pitt Rivers Museum